José Vicente de Moura (born 1937) is the current president of the Olympic Committee of Portugal since 1997. This is his second term on this office, as he also held this position from 1990 to 1992. He was Portugal's chief of mission at the 1984 Summer Olympics in Los Angeles, United States, where this nation conquered its first Olympic gold medal.

References

1937 births
Living people
Portuguese military officers
International Olympic Committee members
Date of birth missing (living people)